Tim Henman was the defending champion but lost in the quarterfinals to David Nalbandian.

Nalbandian won in the final 6–4, 6–3, 6–2 against Fernando González.

Seeds
A champion seed is indicated in bold text while text in italics indicates the round in which that seed was eliminated.

  Tim Henman (quarterfinals)
  Juan Carlos Ferrero (semifinals)
  Roger Federer (semifinals)
  Albert Costa (first round)
  Andy Roddick (quarterfinals)
  David Nalbandian (champion)
  Fernando González (final)
  Àlex Corretja (first round)

Draw

 NB: The Final was the best of 5 sets while all other rounds were the best of 3 sets.

Final

Section 1

Section 2

External links
 2002 Davidoff Swiss Indoors Draw

2002 ATP Tour
2002 Davidoff Swiss Indoors